Kinship is a relationship between any entities that share a genealogical origin, through either biological, cultural, or historical descent.

Kinship may also refer to:

 Kinship (number theory), an unsolved problem in mathematics
 Kinship (TV series), a Singaporean Chinese drama
 Bloodline (1963 film), a/k/a Kinship, a Korean drama film directed by Kim Soo-yong
 Kinship (2019 film), a Canadian short drama film directed by Jorge Camarotti

See also
Kinsman (disambiguation)